Kuldeep Hooda (born 15 November 1989) is an Indian first-class cricketer who plays for Haryana. He made his first-class debut for Haryana in the 2012–13 Ranji Trophy on 2 November 2012.

References

External links
 

1989 births
Living people
Indian cricketers
Haryana cricketers